Timpson is a city in Shelby County, Texas, United States. The population was 989 at the 2020 census. The community is named after T.B Timpson, a railroad engineer.

History 

Timpson was founded in 1885 upon the arrival of the  Houston, East and West Texas Railway.  It reached its maximum population in 1925 when it was important in the shipping of lignite.

The town became well known in the 1930s and 1940s via the popularity of the Tex Ritter song 'Tenaha, Timpson, Bobo, and Blair', which refers to the string of towns in Shelby County.

Geography

Timpson is located at  (31.906280, –94.397859).

According to the United States Census Bureau, the city has a total area of 2.5 square miles (6.5 km), of which, 2.5 square miles (6.5 km) of it is land and 0.40% is water.

Timpson is located at the convergence of U.S. Route 59 (Future Interstate 69) and U.S. Route 84.

Like all "railroad" towns Timpson was laid out with the railroad, and not north and south as most towns are. Therefore, the streets run at an angle of 43 degrees "off". When the town was incorporated, Charlie Noblet's map was adopted and is now on record at the county seat, and is the official map of the city today.

Demographics

As of the 2020 United States census, there were 989 people, 505 households, and 279 families residing in the city.

As of the census of 2000, there were 1,094 people, 456 households, and 269 families residing in the city. The population density was 437.3 people per square mile (169.0/km). There were 559 housing units at an average density of 223.4 per square mile (86.3/km). The racial makeup of the city was 60.51% White, 35.56% African American, 0.64% Native American, 0.09% Asian, 2.38% from other races, and 0.82% from two or more races. Hispanic or Latino of any race were 4.48% of the population.

There were 456 households, out of which 27.2% had children under the age of 18 living with them, 38.6% were married couples living together, 16.9% had a female householder with no husband present, and 40.8% were non-families. 36.6% of all households were made up of individuals, and 24.8% had someone living alone who was 65 years of age or older. The average household size was 2.40 and the average family size was 3.18.

In the city, the population was spread out, with 29.1% under the age of 18, 8.0% from 18 to 24, 22.5% from 25 to 44, 18.3% from 45 to 64, and 22.2% who were 65 years of age or older. The median age was 37 years. For every 100 females, there were 72.8 males. For every 100 females age 18 and over, there were 71.3 males.

The median income for a household in the city was $17,500, and the median income for a family was $24,271. Males had a median income of $21,765 versus $19,000 for females. The per capita income for the city was $11,734. About 25.5% of families and 32.4% of the population were below the poverty line, including 46.8% of those under age 18 and 23.7% of those age 65 or over.

Education

Public education in the city of Timpson is provided by the Timpson Independent School District and home to the Timpson High School Bears.

Media

The Light and Champion, a news and information company, marked its 140th year of operation in 2017. It serves Shelby County, as well as Logansport, Louisiana. The Light and Champion produces a weekly print edition, a weekly free-distribution print product called The Merchandiser, operates a web site, www.lightandchampion.com, and a Facebook page. The Light and Champion is owned by Moser Community Media, based in Brenham, Texas.

Lake Timpson 

Lake Timpson is a reservoir in Shelby County in the state of Texas. The latitude and longitude coordinates for this reservoir are 31.8443, -94.4291 and the altitude is 318 feet (97 m).

Lake Timpson Dam is on Blackwater Creek and is used for recreation purposes. Construction was completed in 1956. It is owned by Shelby Co Freshwater Supply District No 1, located in Timpson, Texas. Lake Timpson Dam is of earthen construction. The core is homogeneous, earth. The foundation is unlisted or unknown.

The most popular game fish at Timpson Reservoir is the largemouth bass. Numbers of bass are relatively high and an excellent fishery exists. Due to the 14-21 inch slot limit, Timpson produces a good number of trophy-sized bass. Crappie and catfish are present in the reservoir, but numbers are relatively low and few anglers target these species. Bluegill and redear sunfish provide fair fishing, especially for youth or inexperienced anglers.

Notable people

 Bert Coan, football player, was born in Timpson 
 Ardath Mayhar, fantasy and science-fiction writer, was born in Timpson

References

External links
  Timpson online 
  Timpson information

Cities in Shelby County, Texas
Cities in Texas
Populated places established in 1885
1885 establishments in Texas